Wefelpütt is a small village in Germany with only 63 inhabitants.

Since 1929 it belongs to the city of Wuppertal.

Villages in North Rhine-Westphalia
Wuppertal